Darrell K. Sweet (August 15, 1934 – December 5, 2011) was a professional illustrator best known for providing cover art for science fiction and fantasy novels, in which capacity he was nominated for a Hugo Award in 1983.

Life and career
Sweet was born in Highland Park, New Jersey. He graduated from Syracuse University in 1956 with a degree in fine arts. He also produced art for trading cards and calendars. He was famous for providing the covers of the fantasy epic saga The Wheel of Time, save for that of the final book, which postdated Sweet's death. He was also the illustrator for the well-known Xanth series by Piers Anthony, the covers of the Pelbar Cycle by Paul O. Williams, the Saga of Recluce series by L. E. Modesitt, Jr. and the Runelords series by David Farland as well as the original cover artist for Stephen R. Donaldson's series The Chronicles of Thomas Covenant the Unbeliever.

Sweet designed book covers for Ballantine Books in 1974. He moved to Del Rey Books in 1975, when Judy-Lynn del Rey hired him to produce the front cover for Fritz Leiber's novel Gather, Darkness!. Between 1975 and 2005, Sweet produced over 3000 images. He died in 2011.

Professional recognition
Sweet was a guest of honor at Tuckercon in 2007, at the 2010 World Fantasy Convention in 2010, and LepreCon in 2011. In 2011, he was selected as a guest of honor for LoneStarCon 3; after his death, LoneStarCon chose to "continue to feature him in memoriam as one of our honored Guests."

References

External links
 Official website (archived) Sweetartwork.com at Internet Archive   
 

1934 births
2011 deaths
Fantasy artists
People from Highland Park, New Jersey
Place of death missing
Science fiction artists
Syracuse University alumni
Tolkien artists